Borzovaya Zaimka is a rural locality (a settlement) in Barnaul, Altai Krai, Russia. The population was 2,229 as of 2013.

Geography 
Borzovaya Zaimka is located 18 km southwest of Barnaul by road. Polzunovo is the nearest rural locality.

References 

Rural localities in Barnaul urban okrug